Fabio Meraldi (born 5 August 1965) is an Italian ski mountaineer, mountain guide and mountain runner.

Meraldi was born in Valtellina. He passed the mountain guide training at the age of 20, and participated in various mountain tours, sky running and ski mountaineering events. He collected four European titles and nine Italian titles amongst other cups and medals, won the Pierra Menta ten times (s. below) and the Sellaronda Skimarathon six times. He also holds some important world records of speed ascending to high mountains respectively ascending and descending.

Selected results

Ski mountaineering 
 1995:
 1st, Trofeo Kima
 1st, Sellaronda Skimarathon (together with Enrico Pedrini)
 1st, Dolomiti Cup team (together with Enrico Pedrini)
 1996:
 1st, Sellaronda Skimarathon (together with Enrico Pedrini)
 1st, Dolomiti Cup team (together with Enrico Pedrini)
 1997:
 1st, Dolomiti Cup team (together with Enrico Pedrini)
 1st, Tour du Rutor (together with Enrico Pedrini)
 2nd, Trofeo Kima
 1998:
 1st, Sellaronda Skimarathon (together with Enrico Pedrini)
 1st, Dolomiti Cup team (together with Enrico Pedrini)
 2nd, Trofeo Kima
 1999:
 1st, Sellaronda Skimarathon (together with Enrico Pedrini)
 1st, Tour du Rutor (together with Enrico Pedrini)
 2000:
 1st, Sellaronda Skimarathon (together with Enrico Pedrini)
 1st, Mountain Attack
 1st, Trofeo Kima
 2001:
 2nd, Trofeo Kima
 2002:
 1st, Sellaronda Skimarathon (together with Carlo Battel)
 9th, World Championship single race

Trofeo Mezzalama 

 1997: 1st, together with Enrico Pedrini and Omar Oprandi
 1999: 2nd, together with Enrico Pedrini and Pierre Gignoux
 2001: 2nd together with Jean Pellissier and Stéphane Brosse

Pierra Menta 

 1989: 1st, together with Adriano Greco
 1990: 1st, together with Adriano Greco
 1991: 1st, together with Adriano Greco
 1992: 2nd, together with Adriano Greco
 1993: 1st, together with Adriano Greco
 1994: 1st, together with Adriano Greco
 1995: 1st, together with Thierry Bochet
 1996: 1st, together with Enrico Pedrini
 1997: 1st, together with Enrico Pedrini
 1998: 3rd, together with Enrico Pedrini
 1999: 1st, together with Enrico Pedrini
 2000: 1st, together with Enrico Pedrini

Skyrunning 
 1994: 1st, Monte Rosa SkyMarathon
 1995: 1st, Sentiero 4 Luglio SkyMarathon
 2000: 1st, Sentiero 4 Luglio SkyMarathon

References

External links 
 Personal website

1965 births
Living people
Italian male ski mountaineers
Italian male mountain runners
Italian sky runners
Sportspeople from the Province of Sondrio